The Mariamite Cathedral of Damascus, also known as the Maryamiyya Church, is one of the oldest Greek Orthodox churches in Damascus, Syria and holds the seat of the Greek Orthodox Church of Antioch. The church complex is located on the Street Called Straight.

History
A first church was built during the 4th century AD or probably earlier. After the Muslim conquest of Damascus the church was closed until 706 AD when al-Walid ordered that it be returned to the Christians as a compensation for the Church of John the Baptist which was turned into the Umayyad Mosque.

The church was destroyed and rebuilt several times in later years. It was described by Ibn Jubayr as:

In 1342, the Patriarchal See of Antioch was transferred from Antioch to Damascus and the church served as the seat of the Greek Orthodox Church in the East.

The church was burned down by mobs, along with most of the Christian quarter, when the 1860 Druze-Christian conflict in Lebanon spilt over into Damascus, and was rebuilt three years later. It was last renovated in 1953.

Sections

Church of Mary
The Church of Mary is the main church building, and dates back to the late 4th century.

Chapel of Saint Tekla
The chapel was added to the complex after the restoration of the cathedral in 1840. It comprises the patriarchal seat of the Greek Orthodox Church of Antioch.

Chapel of Catherine
The chapel was added after restoration works. It contains a small museum dedicated to the history of the church.

Gallery

External Links 
Get a 360° virtual tour on the Ministry of tourism's website: https://syriatourism.org/Virtual_Tours/Maryameyya%20Church/

References

2nd-century churches
Mariamite Cathedral
Christian organizations established in the 2nd century
Eastern Orthodox church buildings in Syria
2nd-century establishments in the Roman Empire
7th-century disestablishments in the Byzantine Empire
1860 disestablishments in Ottoman Syria
1863 establishments in Ottoman Syria